Bihar Vidhan Parishad, also known as Bihar Legislative Council, is the upper house of the bicameral Bihar Legislature of the state of Bihar in India.

History
A new Province of Bihar and Odisha was created by the Government of India on 12 December 1911. The Legislative Council with a total of 43 members belonging to different categories was formed in 1912. The first sitting of the Council was convened on 20 January 1913 at Patna College Bankipore. In 1920 Bihar and Orissa declared governor province, as per Government of India Act 1919. As per Government of India Act 1935 Bihar and Orissa was split into separate provinces of Bihar and Orissa. In 1936, [Bihar] attained its separate Statehood. Under the Government of India Act, 1919, the unicameral legislature got converted into bicameral one, i.e., the Bihar Legislative Council and the Bihar Legislative Assembly. Under the Government of India Act, 1935, the Bihar Legislative Council consisted of 29 members. On March 21, 1938, the session of the Bihar Legislative Council took place in a newly built building. On 1 April 1950, the secretariat of BLC started functioning. After the first General Elections 1952, the number of members was increased up to 72 and by 1958 the number was raised to 96. With the creation of Jharkhand, as a result of the Bihar Reorganisation Act, 2000 passed by the Parliament, the strength of the Bihar Legislative Council has been reduced from 96 to 75 members. Some veteran council members B. P. Mandal, Jagannath Mishra, Satyendra Narain Singh and Lalu Prasad Yadav have also served as Chief Minister of Bihar.

Working
Bihar Legislative Council is a permanent body and not subject to dissolution. But as nearly as possible, one-third of the members thereof  retire as soon as may be on the expiration of every second year. Members are now elected or nominated for six years and one-third of them retire every second year. The presiding officers of Vidhan Parishad are now known as Chairman and Deputy Chairman.  Members of the upper house, the Legislative Council are indirectly elected through an electoral college. There are 27 Committees which are, at present, functional in the Council. Besides, there are three Financial Committees consisting of the members of the two Houses of the State Legislature.

Current members
 Chairman : Devesh Chandra Thakur 
 Deputy Chairman : Ram Chandra Purve
 Leader of  the House : Nitish Kumar
 Deputy Leader of  the House : Tejashwi Yadav
 Government's Chief Whip : Sanjay Kumar Singh urf Sanjay Gandhi 
 Leader of the Opposition : Samrat Chaudhary

Elected by Legislative Assembly Members (27)
Keys:

Elected from Local Authorities Constituencies (24)
Keys:

Elected from Graduates Constituencies (6)
Keys:

Elected from Teachers Constituencies (6)
Keys:

Nominated (12)
Keys:

See also
List of members of the Bihar Legislative Council
Vidhan Parishad
Administration in Bihar
List of states of India by type of legislature

External links
 Official Website

References

 
1912 establishments in India